The 2024 North Carolina gubernatorial election will be held on November 5, 2024, to elect the Governor of North Carolina, concurrently with the 2024 U.S. presidential election, as well as elections to the United States Senate, elections to the United States House of Representatives, and various other state and local elections. Incumbent Democratic Governor Roy Cooper is term-limited and cannot seek re-election to a third consecutive term in office.

Background 
A typical swing state, North Carolina is considered to be a purple to slightly red state at the federal level, but has both of its U.S. senators belonging to the Republican Party. However, some state-wide offices are held by Democrats including the governorship, secretary of state, and attorney general. In the 2020 presidential election, Donald Trump carried North Carolina by just 1 percentage point.

The incumbent, Roy Cooper, was first elected in 2016, defeating then-incumbent Pat McCrory by 0.2 points. Cooper was re-elected in 2020 by 4.5 points.

The 2024 election is expected to be very competitive, as North Carolina is a purple state and this election is taking place in a presidential year, and the incumbent is term-limited making this seat open. The only Democrat that has declared their candidacy  is Josh Stein, the current attorney general.

Democratic primary

Candidates

Declared
 Josh Stein, North Carolina Attorney General (2017–present)

Potential
Cheri Beasley, former Chief Justice (2019–2020) and Associate Justice (2012–2020) of the North Carolina Supreme Court, and nominee for U.S. Senate in 2022
Mandy Cohen, former Secretary of the North Carolina Department of Health and Human Services (2017–2021)
Cal Cunningham, former state senator from the 23rd district (2001–2003), nominee for U.S. Senate in 2020 and candidate in 2010
Michael Regan, administrator of the Environmental Protection Agency (2021–present) and former Secretary of the North Carolina Department of Environmental Quality (2017–2021)

Endorsements

Polling

Republican primary

Candidates

Publicly expressed interest
Dale Folwell, North Carolina State Treasurer (2017–present)
Mark Robinson, Lieutenant Governor of North Carolina (2021–present)

Potential
Tim Moore, Speaker of the North Carolina House of Representatives (2015–present) from the 111th district (2003–present)
Thom Tillis, U.S. Senator from North Carolina (2015–present)
Steve Troxler, North Carolina Commissioner of Agriculture (2005–present)

Polling

General election

Predictions

Polling

Josh Stein vs. Mark Robinson

Notes

Partisan clients

References

External links
Official campaign websites 
Josh Stein (D) for Governor

2024
Governor
North Carolina